Essex 3 (also known as Essex Oranjeboom League 3 for sponsorship reasons) was an English Rugby Union league which was at the eleventh tier of the domestic competition.  It was formerly the basement division of club rugby in Essex and promoted teams moved up to Essex 2. Originally formed in 2003 by breakaway Essex clubs from East Counties 3 South the division ran for six seasons before being abolished at the end of the 2008–09 campaign.

Original teams

When Essex 3 was introduced in 2003 it contained the following teams:

Kings Cross Steelers - transferred from Eastern Counties 3 South (8th)
May & Baker - transferred from Eastern Counties 3 South (4th)
Millwall - N/A (joined league)
Pegasus Palmerians - transferred from Eastern Counties 3 South (6th)
Old Cooperians - transferred from Eastern Counties 3 South (5th)
Ongar - transferred from Eastern Counties 3 South (7th)
Witham - transferred from Eastern Counties 3 North (8th)

Essex 3 honours

Number of league titles

Millwall (1)
Old Cooperians (1)
Pegasus Palmerians (1)
Runwell Wyverns (1)
Witham (1)
Writtle Wanderers (1)

Notes

See also
Essex RFU
English rugby union system
Rugby union in England

References

E
Rugby union in Essex
Sports leagues established in 2003
Sports leagues disestablished in 2009
2003 establishments in England
2009 disestablishments in England